Line 6 of the Madrid Metro opened originally between Cuatro Caminos and Pacifico in 1979. This is one of two circular lines in Madrid, but unlike Line 12, it did not open as a full circle. The circle was completed in 1995, taking four stages from its original opening. It has a length of 23.5km.

History
First on 7 May 1981, the line was extended from Pacifico to Oporto, then on 1 June 1983, the line was extended from Oporto to Laguna. Thirdly the line was extended from Cuatro Caminos to Ciudad Universitaria serving Madrid's Complutense university on 13 January 1987, and lastly the line was extended from Ciudad Universitaria to Laguna on 10 May 1995, completing the circle. Arganzuela-Planetario station opened on 26 January 2007 between Legazpi and Méndez Álvaro. This station serves Madrid's Planetarium and IMAX theatre.

Line 6 is one of the busiest lines on the network, so to ease congestion on the busiest stations, Madrid adopted the "Spanish solution". This means that at some stations there are two side platforms, and an island platform. This was also used on Line 5, but only two stations preserve the original layout (Campamento and Carabanchel).

Line 6 uses 6-car trains of mostly class 8400, however the line still has class 5000s on the line.

See also
 Madrid
 Transport in Madrid
 List of Madrid Metro stations
 List of metro systems

References

External links

  Madrid Metro (official website)
 Schematic map of the Metro network – from the official site 
 Madrid at UrbanRail.net
 ENGLISH User guide, ticket types, airport supplement and timings
 Network map (real-distance)
 Madrid Metro Map

06 (Madrid Metro)
Railway loop lines
Railway lines opened in 1979
1979 establishments in Spain